The 2011 Eurocup Formula Renault 2.0 season was the 21st Eurocup Formula Renault 2.0 season. The season commenced on 16 April at Alcañiz and ended on 9 October at Barcelona. The season features seven double-header rounds, with each race lasting for a duration of 30 minutes. All races were part of the World Series by Renault.

Josef Kaufmann Racing's Robin Frijns who is also last Formula BMW Europe champion won five races on his way to the championship by a 45-point margin over another former Formula BMW driver Carlos Sainz Jr., who won opening race on Ciudad del Motor de Aragón and Circuit de Spa-Francorchamps. Frijns finished in the top five in every race. The same point margin was between Sainz and his third placed teammate Daniil Kvyat, who also won two races on Circuit de Spa-Francorchamps and Nürburgring. Other wins were scored by Will Stevens, Alex Riberas, Javier Tarancón and FIA Institute Young Driver Excellence Academy drivers Timmy Hansen and Paul-Loup Chatin.

Regulation changes

Sporting
 The points system for the 2011 season changed to reflect the system used by the FIA for World championships. The top ten drivers in each race were awarded points as follows: 25, 18, 15, 12, 10, 8, 6, 4, 2, and 1.
 The series adopted a format introduced in the 2010 Formula Renault 3.5 Series season with one qualifying and race each day.

Teams and drivers
 At Spa, competitors from the Formula Renault 2.0 Northern European Cup joined the Eurocup runners in each of the sessions to be held, running as guest drivers ineligible for points. These entries are listed in italics.

Driver changes
 Changed teams

 After driving for Epsilon Euskadi in his rookie season, Javier Tarancón switched to Tech 1 Racing. Miki Weckström moved from Koiranen Bros. Motorsport his team-mate.

 Entering/Re-Entering Eurocup Formula Renault 2.0
 Josef Kaufmann Racing signed Formula BMW Europe champion Robin Frijns, F4 Eurocup 1.6 third-placed Mathieu Jaminet and Formula BMW Pacific runner-up Óscar Andrés Tunjo.
 KTR have signed F4 Eurocup 1.6 champion Stoffel Vandoorne and Liroy Stuart to compete for the team.
 Red Bull Junior Team's drivers Daniil Kvyat and Carlos Sainz Jr. will move into the championship, having raced in Formula BMW Europe for EuroInternational. They will drive for defending drivers' champions Koiranen Bros. Motorsport. Joni Wiman will move up from ADAC Formel Masters and John Bryant Meisner from Formula Renault NEZ to complete Koiranen's four-car team.
 Timmy Hansen and Côme Ledogar will also move from Formula BMW Europe to compete for Interwetten.com Racing Junior Team and R-ace GP respectively.
 Formula Renault UK driver Will Stevens will rejoin Fortec Motorsport, having competed at the Hungaroring in 2010 with Manor Competition. He will be joined by Skip Barber National Championship driver Félix Serrallés, with Fahmi Ilyas joining the team at Spa for experience ahead of the British F3 round later in the season.
 Paul-Loup Chatin and Grégoire Demoustier moved from the F4 Eurocup and French GT Championship respectively to drive for Tech 1 Racing.
 Thomas Jäger will compete in formulae cars for the first time, competing for the Interwetten.com Racing Junior Team. Gustavo Menezes joined the team from Star Mazda at the Spa round.
 After Russian ice racing and two seasons in Finnish Legends Trophy, Denis Nagulin will join Cram Competition.
 Pieter Schothorst stepped up from Formula Ford Duratec Benelux to race for R-ace GP.
 Asian Formula Renault champion Sandy Stuvik moved to Europe to compete for KEO Racing.

Race calendar and results
The calendar for the 2011 season was announced on 11 October 2010, the day after the end of the 2010 season. All seven rounds will form meetings of the 2011 World Series by Renault season.

Championship standings
 Points for both championships are awarded as follows:

Drivers' Championship

Teams' Championship

References

External links
 Renault-Sport official website

Eurocup Formula Renault 2.0
Eurocup Formula Renault 2.0
Eurocup
Renault Eurocup